Kraft Foods in the Ruscote ward of Banbury, Oxfordshire, England is a large food and coffee producing factory in the north of the town.

Built in 1964, it was partly due to the London overspill. Kraft Foods Banbury is the Kraft Foods centre of manufacturing with the Kraft UK headquarters located at Uxbridge. The factory is still sometimes known as General Foods after the American company which originally owned the building, before 'GF' as it is commonly known was taken over by Kraft.

During October 2006, a block of Kraft Foods that was being prepared for demolition caught on fire and remained on fire for most of the day.

There was a non-lethal fire at the coffee plant on Tuesday 7 December 2010.

In Spring 2010, a truckload of Kenco Coffee was stolen by a driver who conned his way into the plant.

With the split of Kraft General Foods into Mondelez International and Kraft Foods in October 2012,  this factory site became part of new company Mondelez International

See also
History of Banbury
Kraft Foods
Banburyshire

References

Buildings and structures in Oxfordshire
Banbury
Food manufacturers of the United Kingdom
Manufacturing plants in England